Josiah Ofori Boateng is a retired justice of the Supreme Court of Ghana and a former Chairman of the Electoral Commission of Ghana. He served on the Supreme Court bench from 1999 to 2001 and chaired the Electoral Commission of Ghana from 1989 to 1992.

Ofori Boateng was a member of the Ghana Bar Association, an honorary member of the International Bar Association, a chairman of the Council for Law Reporting, and a member of the International Juridical Organisation.

Early life and education
Ofori Boateng hails from Aburi in the Eastern Region of Ghana. He was born in the early 1930s to a Presbyterian minister in the then Gold Coast. He had his secondary education at Achimota School and his tertiary education at the University College of the Gold Coast (now the University of Ghana) and the University College of London where he was awarded his Bachelor of Laws (llb) degree. He enrolled at Lincoln's Inn and was called to the English bar in 1963. He was later called to the Ghanaian bar in 1965.

Career
Ofori Boateng begun as an Assistant State Attorney, solicitor and advocate, and district magistrate until his appointment as deputy judicial secretary in 1969. From 1973 until 1976, he was the administrative head of the Ghana Law Reform Commission. In 1976, he became the chief legal advisor on Environmental problems at the United Nations, he served in this capacity until 1981. He returned to Ghana after his stint at the United Nations and took up an appointment as the Director of Legal Education (head of Ghana School of Law). He was appointed Appeal Court judge in 1989 and in 1992 he was appointed Chairman of the Electoral Commission of Ghana with Kwadwo Afari-Gyan as his deputy. As chair of the commission he oversaw the 1992 Ghanaian presidential election and declared the results of the election. He chaired the commission until 1993 when he returned to the Appeals Court bench. In 1999, he was nominated to join the Supreme Court bench together with Justice John Debra Sapong. He was vetted and approved by parliament on 30 March 1999. He together with Justice Sapong were sworn into office as judges of the Supreme Court on 15 April 1999. He remained a Supreme Court judge until his retirement on 4 January 2001. 
Ofori Boateng has published a number of papers on Law and Environmental issues. He was also a visiting scholar at Harvard Law School and the Environmental Institute in Washington.

Personal life
Ofori Boateng is married. In his spare time, he likes to listen to classical music, work on his poultry farm and write on legal subjects. He is the brother of the late professor Ernest Amano Boateng, the first Vice Chancellor of the University of Cape Coast.

See also
List of judges of the Supreme Court of Ghana
Supreme Court of Ghana

References

Justices of the Supreme Court of Ghana
20th-century Ghanaian judges
Alumni of Achimota School
University of Ghana alumni
Alumni of the University of London
Alumni of University College London